Chile competed at the 2022 Winter Olympics in Beijing, China, from 4 to 20 February 2022.

The Chilean team consisted of four athletes (two men and two women) competing in three sports. Dominique Ohaco and Henrik von Appen were the country's flagbearer during the opening ceremony. A volunteer served as the flagbearer during the closing ceremony.

Competitors
The following is the list of number of competitors who participated at the Games per sport/discipline.

Alpine skiing

By meeting the basic qualification standards Chile qualified one male and one female alpine skier.

Cross-country skiing

By meeting the basic qualification standards Chile qualified one male cross-country skier.

Distance

Freestyle skiing

Freeski

See also
Chile at the 2022 Winter Paralympics

References

Nations at the 2022 Winter Olympics
2022
2022 in Chilean sport